Karl Gottfried Erdmann (31 March 1774 – 13 January 1835) was a German physician and botanist. He was the father of chemist Otto Linné Erdmann (1804–1869).

Erdmann was born in Wittenberg. In 1798 he received his medical doctorate from the University of Wittenberg with the dissertation "De nexu theoriam et praxin medicam intercedente". In 1799 he became a licensed  physician in Dresden, and up until 1824 he held the position of sanitation assessor. He is credited for introducing vaccinations for smallpox in Dresden in 1801. He died in Dresden, aged 60.

Selected works 
 Sammlung und beschreibung der giftpflanzen die in Sachsen wildwachsen, 1797 – Collection and description of poisonous plants growing wild in Saxony.  
 Gewächse der Obersächsischen Flora, 1800 – On flora of Upper Saxony.
 Übersicht der theoretischen und practischen Botanik nach ihrem ganzen Umfange, 1802 – Tabular overview of theoretical and practical botany.
 Aufsätze und Beobachtungen aus allen Theilen der Arzneiwissenschaft, 1802 – Essays and observations from all parts of medical science.

References 

1774 births
1835 deaths
Scientists from Wittenberg
University of Wittenberg alumni
19th-century German physicians
19th-century German botanists